Kanawha is a city in Hancock County, Iowa, United States. The population was 658 at the time of the 2020 census.

History

Kanawha was platted in 1899. The newly constructed railroad had arrived from Belmond, Iowa. Business' and some buildings moved from settlements three to four miles distant to establish in the new town on the railroad. Those settlements were Cuba, to the north, Magor, to the northwest, Mikesville, to the southwest, Aldrich, to the south (Drew, moved and renamed Bruce, was farther south), West Lake, to the east, and Bailey's Grove to the north east. Kanawha's founder, George Casper Call, petitioned Congressman J.P. Dolliver requesting a post office and proposing the name "Luzon". Luzon was rejected because it was thought to be too close to the name of an existing Iowa, Luzerne in Benton County. Faced with having to find another name, a railroad engineer and West Virginia native, suggested "Kanawha". The name met with approval.

Geography
Kanawha is located at  (42.936773, -93.794305).

Demographics

2010 census
As of the census of 2010, there were 652 people, 291 households, and 167 families residing in the city. The racial makeup of the city was 96.8% White, 0.8% African American, 0.6% Native American, 0.3% Asian, 0.8% from other races, and 0.8% from two or more races. Hispanic or Latino of any race were 5.2% of the population.

There were 291 households, of which 24.7% had children under the age of 18 living with them, 46.0% were married couples living together, 6.9% had a female householder with no husband present, 4.5% had a male householder with no wife present, and 42.6% were non-families. 37.8% of all households were made up of individuals, and 23.4% had someone living alone who was 65 years of age or older. The average household size was 2.16 and the average family size was 2.87.

The median age in the city was 47 years. 21.6% of residents were under the age of 18; 6% were between the ages of 18 and 24; 19.4% were from 25 to 44; 24.5% were from 45 to 64; and 28.5% were 65 years of age or older. The gender makeup of the city was 47.9% male and 52.1% female.

2000 census
As of the census of 2000, there were 739 people, 309 households, and 194 families residing in the city. The racial makeup of the city was 97.70% White, 0.68% Native American, 0.68% from other races, and 0.95% from two or more races. Hispanic or Latino of any race were 2.30% of the population.

There were 309 households, out of which 24.6% had children under the age of 18 living with them, 55.0% were married couples living together, 5.2% had a female householder with no husband present, and 37.2% were non-families. 34.6% of all households were made up of individuals, and 22.0% had someone living alone who was 65 years of age or older. The average household size was 2.26 and the average family size was 2.90.

In the city, the population was spread out, with 22.3% under the age of 18, 5.7% from 18 to 24, 22.2% from 25 to 44, 19.2% from 45 to 64, and 30.6% who were 65 years of age or older. The median age was 45 years. For every 100 females, there were 83.8 males. For every 100 females age 18 and over, there were 80.5 males.

The median income for a household in the city was $36,250, and the median income for a family was $42,031. Males had a median income of $27,273 versus $20,288 for females. The per capita income for the city was $18,429. About 2.5% of families and 5.1% of the population were below the poverty line, including 4.0% of those under age 18 and 2.2% of those age 65 or over.

Education
Kindergarten through 12th grade students from Kanawha attend the West Hancock Community School District. The district formed on July 1, 1994, with the merger of the Britt and Kanawha districts.

Kanawha is also home to Kanawha Christian School which serves kindergarten through 8th grade students in a 35-mile radius.

References

Cities in Hancock County, Iowa
Cities in Iowa
Populated places established in 1899
1899 establishments in Iowa